Anomiopus ataenioides is a species of true dung beetle that is endemic to northern Argentina, and is known from Salta, Jujuy, Tucumán and Corrientes provinces. It is believed to share ant colony nests (myrmecophile).

References

Anomiopus
Endemic fauna of Argentina
Beetles described in 1952